Houli may refer to:

Houli, Taichung, township in northwestern Taichung County, Taiwan
Houli culture, Neolithic culture in Shandong, China
Asma Houli, (born 1976), Algerian chess player
Bachar Houli (born 1988), Australian rules footballer